Jennifer Ognibene, known by her stage name Jenny O., is an American singer-songwriter, based in Los Angeles, California.

Early life and education
Jenny O. grew up on Long Island, New York. She studied jazz at State University of New York at New Paltz and Composition at State University of New York at Purchase Conservatory of Music.

Career

2010–2012: Home EP
In 2010, Jenny O. released a five-song EP of demo recordings titled Home. The first single, "Well OK Honey," appeared in the real-guitar-based video game Rocksmith, HBO's True Blood, and a television campaign by Toyota. In the same year, "Won't Let You Leave" was licensed by Subaru in a television campaign.

Jenny was a member of the LA Ladies Choir, who released one album, "Sing Joyfully" on Teenage Teardrops Records in 2010.

2013–2015: Automechanic and Holy Trinity Records
On February 5, 2013, Jenny O. released an album, Automechanic on her own label, Holy Trinity Records. The album was produced by Jonathan Wilson in Echo Park, Los Angeles and features James Gadson on drums.

2016: Work EP
On October 7, 2016, Jenny O. released a second EP of demo recordings, titled Work. The first single, "Cheer Up Free Your Mind," was re-recorded in Simlish for The Sims 4 video game. "Case Study B" plays in Episode 605 of Orange Is The New Black.

2017–2019: Peace & Information
Peace & Information, Jenny O.’s second album, was produced by Jonathan Wilson and released August 4, 2017 on Holy Trinity Records. The song "Trauma Jules" was licensed by the U.S. television series Shameless. "Power & Charm" appears in Riverdale. The song "If You're Lonely" is heard over the closing credits of Season 2, Episode 8 of the Bravo series Imposters.

2020: New Truth
Jenny O.'s third album, produced by Kevin Ratterman, was released August 7, 2020 on Mama Bird Recording Co.

Singles and compilations
"Get Down For The Holidays", The Christmas Gig, a Target holiday compilation, 2010.
"I'm Gonna Love You Too" by Buddy Holly, Rave On Buddy Holly, Fantasy Records/Concord Music Group, 2011.  
"The Happiest Days of Our Lives/Another Brick In The Wall, Part 2", by Pink Floyd, Cool For School, Manimal Vinyl, 2014.
"Ragtime Queen", Fraggle Rock – Dream a Dream and See, Beta-Petrol, 2013.
"1941," This Is The Town – A Tribute To Harry Nilsson (Volume 1), Royal Potato Family, 2014. 
"Waterfalls" by TLC produced for the television series, Grey's Anatomy Holy Trinity Records, 2015.
 "Can't Seem to Make You Mine" by The Seeds, Holy Trinity Records, 2019.
 "Not My President," Holy Trinity Records, 2020.

Television and film 
On December 12, 2013, Jenny O. appeared with her band, Jenny O. & the High Society, on Last Call with Carson Daly, performing "Seashells" and "Automechanic." They appeared again on the show March 13, 2014 to perform "Lazy Jane" and "Learned My Lessons."

Jenny O. recorded a version of "Lucky" by songwriter Kat Edmonson for a Coca-Cola television campaign which aired during the 2014 Winter Olympics.

In 2014, she performed the theme song for the ABC television series Selfie.

Background vocals 
Jenny O. provided vocals on the following recordings:
 "Funtimes In Babylon," Father John Misty, Fear Fun, 2012.
 "'99," Harper Simon, Division Street, 2013.
 "Hummingbird," Bonnie "Prince" Billy, by Leon Russell, 2014.
 "I'll See You Again," Bonnie 'Prince' Billy, by Roy Harper, 2014. 
 "Moses Pain," Jonathan Wilson, Fanfare, Bella Union, 2015.
 "Stone Cold Daddy-O," Jonny Fritz, Sweet Creep, ATO, 2016.
 Richard Edwards, Lemon Cotton Candy Sunset, Joyful Noise, 2017.
 "Sylvie," Leslie Stevens, Thirty Tigers, Sinner, 2019.

Touring 
In 2011, Jenny O. toured the U.S. West Coast with Ben Harper, Leon Russell, and Father John Misty. In 2013, she completed a U.S. and European tour with Sixto Rodriguez. She has subsequently toured with The Proclaimers, Rodrigo Amarante, Rhett Miller, Dar Williams, Joe Purdy, Robert Ellis, The Wild Reeds, Radical Face, and Faye Webster. Jenny O. has also opened for Tegan and Sara, Wanda Jackson, and Adam Green.

See also

 List of Manimal Vinyl artists
 List of people from New York (state)
 List of people from Los Angeles
 List of State University of New York at Purchase people
 List of singer-songwriters

References

External links
 
 
 Video for "Well OK Honey," from the album Home
 Jenny O. performs "Won't Let You Leave", live on QMtv session, April 23, 2011
 Live acoustic solo session on WFMU radio, April 3, 2013 (posted in the station's Free Music Archive)

Year of birth missing (living people)
Place of birth missing (living people)
20th-century births
20th-century American singers
20th-century American writers
20th-century American composers
20th-century American women writers
21st-century American singers
21st-century American writers
21st-century American composers
21st-century American women writers
American women rock singers
American women singer-songwriters
Living people
Singers from Los Angeles
Singer-songwriters from New York (state)
People from Long Island
State University of New York at Purchase alumni
Writers from Los Angeles
Writers from New York (state)
American rock songwriters
20th-century American women singers
21st-century American women singers
20th-century women composers
21st-century women composers
Singer-songwriters from California